Cychrus keithi is a species of ground beetle in the subfamily of Carabinae. It was described by Deuve in 1998.

References

keithi
Beetles described in 1998